Bankhead may refer to:

People
 Bankhead (surname), a surname (including a list of people with the name)

Places

Canada
 Bankhead, Alberta, a former coal mining village, now in Banff National Park

Scotland
 Bankhead, Edinburgh
Bankhead, a neighbourhood of Rutherglen

United States
Bankhead, Atlanta, a neighborhood of Atlanta, Georgia
Bankhead station, a train station in Atlanta on the Metropolitan Atlanta Rapid Transit Authority (MARTA) system
William B. Bankhead National Forest, in the United States state of Alabama

Roads
Bankhead Highway, a road in the United States